General elections were held in Southern Rhodesia on 15 September 1948. They saw Prime Minister Godfrey Huggins regain the overall majority he had lost in the previous elections in 1946. Huggins' United Party won a landslide, reducing the opposition Liberal Party to a small minority.

Background
The 1946 election had left the United Party in a precarious position in an overall minority in the Southern Rhodesian Legislative Assembly, and reliant on the support of the Rhodesia Labour Party. Huggins was therefore seeking an opportunity to re-establish an overall majority. However, Huggins knew from his experience in 1934 that he needed to justify asking for a dissolution of the Assembly and a general election, as the Governor was not necessarily willing to grant one merely because it had been asked for.

Early in 1948, Huggins made his move by proposing that his own United Party merge with the opposition Liberal Party (which was a right-wing organisation). He then went to the Legislative Assembly and put down a motion of confidence in his government which endorsed all its policies for the full term of the Assembly. The Liberal Party, sensing a trap, agreed to the principle of fusion of the two parties but insisted that it be on the basis of Liberal Party policy. When the vote of confidence debate was concluded on 6 February, Huggins accepted an amendment moved by the Rhodesia Labour Party, and the confidence motion then passed without a division. Huggins had lost his chance for an election but gained endorsement of his government.

This situation did not last long. In July, the Coinage and Currency Bill was defeated by one vote on a clause which would have allowed the Currency Board to provide accommodation. Although this was a minor matter, Huggins argued that it was an issue of confidence because this provision had been agreed with the governments of Northern Rhodesia and Nyasaland in the Central African Council; as negotiations to form a new majority government failed, the Governor granted a dissolution.

Supporting Huggins' position, the South African general election in May that year had seen a win by the National Party which largely represented Afrikaners. This election marked a transfer of power away from the English-speaking South Africans and shocked the mostly British descended Southern Rhodesians, who recoiled from the Liberal Party who were backed by the small Rhodesian Afrikaner community; the Liberal Party's policy on race was similar to the National Party's policy of Apartheid.

Voters tended not to blame the government for the economic difficulties and petrol shortages which had affected Rhodesia in the years since the war, and the renewed push towards federation with Northern Rhodesia and Nyasaland also encouraged support for the United Party. In the end, it delivered a landslide for Huggins; Liberal Party leader Jacob Smit lost his seat.

Electoral system
A Delimitation Commission was set up to redraw the boundaries of the electoral districts. Although the previous districts had only been drawn up in 1938, owing to the major population movements in the war none of the districts were unchanged.

Franchise and electoral procedure
Two Acts passed in the run-up to the election made changes to electoral procedure. The Emergency Laws (Repeal and Transitional Provisions) Act, 1946 repealed most of the Active Service Voters Act, 1943 and therefore removed the ability of Southern Rhodesians serving in forces outside the colony to vote. The provision allowing postal votes to those living more than 10 miles from the polling station was retained.

The Electoral Amendment Act, 1946 made a further series of minor changes. It provided for a new full registration of voters once the delimitation had been completed, and facilitated the disqualification of imprisoned voters by requiring returns of those sentenced to prison. It also allowed candidates to withdraw before the poll.

Results

By constituency

 DP – Dominion Party
 Lab – Rhodesia Labour Party
 L – Liberal Party
 UP – United Party

Changes during the Assembly

Bulawayo District
Alexander Magnus Flett Stuart died on 7 August 1949, and a byelection to replace him was held on 13 October 1949.

Bulawayo North

Hugh Beadle resigned from the Assembly on 20 July 1950 to become a High Court judge. A byelection to fill his Assembly seat in Bulawayo North was held on 19 September 1950.

Highlands

Robert Allan Ballantyne died on 5 February 1953. A byelection to replace him was held on 22 April 1953.

References
 Source Book of Parliamentary Elections and Referenda in Southern Rhodesia 1898–1962 ed. by F.M.G. Willson (Department of Government, University College of Rhodesia and Nyasaland, Salisbury 1963)
 Holders of Administrative and Ministerial Office 1894–1964 by F.M.G. Willson and G.C. Passmore, assisted by Margaret T. Mitchell (Source Book No. 3, Department of Government, University College of Rhodesia and Nyasaland, Salisbury 1966)

Elections in Southern Rhodesia
Southern Rhodesia
Election
1948 elections in the British Empire